Polydeuces may refer to:
Polydeuces (moon), a moon of Saturn
An alternative name for the Greek mythological hero Pollux